"When the Sinner" is a song and a single made by the German power metal band Helloween taken from the album Chameleon. 

They made a promo video, with a scene reflecting the legal conflict with their former record company Noise Records.

The Japanese version included "Oriental Journey" (5:45) instead of the album version of "When the Sinner".

Single track listing

Personnel
Michael Kiske - vocals, acoustic guitar
Roland Grapow - lead and rhythm guitars
Michael Weikath - lead and rhythm guitars
Markus Grosskopf - bass guitar
Ingo Schwichtenberg - drums

References

1993 singles
Helloween songs
Songs written by Michael Kiske
EMI Records singles
German hard rock songs